Serhiy Volodymyrovych Budza (born 6 December 1984, in Subotivka) is a Ukrainian race walker. He competed in the 50 kilometres walk event at the 2012 Summer Olympics.

References

Ukrainian male racewalkers
1984 births
Living people
Olympic athletes of Ukraine
Athletes (track and field) at the 2008 Summer Olympics
Athletes (track and field) at the 2012 Summer Olympics
Athletes (track and field) at the 2016 Summer Olympics
World Athletics Championships athletes for Ukraine
Sportspeople from Vinnytsia Oblast